The Cohen Islands are a cluster of small islands between Ponce Island and Pebbly Mudstone Island in the southeast part of the Duroch Islands.

See also 
 List of Antarctic and sub-Antarctic islands

References 

Islands of the Duroch Islands